The Song of the Singing Horseman is the first album of Irish singer songwriter Jimmy MacCarthy. The album was released in 1991 by Mulligan Records and it includes many of the popular songs MacCarthy wrote during the first ten years of his career including "Ride On", "Mystic Lipstick", "Bright Blue Rose" and "No Frontiers". It was not commercially available for many years but was re-released on MacCarthy's own Ride Own Records in 2016.

Reception
The Song of the Singing Horseman has been described as having a "masterly blend of pop melodies, trad fiddles, Spanish guitars, country-and-western rhythms and chamber-music strings."

Track listing
 On My Enchanted Sight – 4:13
 A Hard Man To Follow – 3:52
 Mystic Lipstick – 4:47
 Missing You – 3:35
 Ride On – 4:23
 No Frontiers – 3:56
 The Mad Lady And Me – 3:18
 The Grip Of Parallel – 4:06
 The Bright Blue Rose – 4:45
 Ancient Rain – 5:23
 The Song of the Singing Horseman – 6:12

References

1991 debut albums
Jimmy MacCarthy albums